The Business Council of Australia (BCA) is an industry association that comprises the chief executives of more than 100 of Australia's biggest corporations. It was formed in 1983 by the merger of the Business Roundtable – a spin-off of the Committee for Economic Development of Australia – and the Australian Industry Development Association. The organisation is headquartered in Melbourne with offices in Sydney and Canberra.

Its stated goal is to give the business community a greater voice in public policy debates about the direction of Australian society.

History

AIPL/AIDA
The Australian Industries Protection League (AIPL) was established in Melbourne in January 1919 as a successor to the Protectionist Association of Victoria. James Hume Cook, a former federal MP and ally of Nationalist leader Billy Hughes, was appointed secretary of the organisation in 1922 and held the position until his death in 1942. He represented the league at the British Empire Economic Conference in Ottawa in 1932.

According to Peter Cochrane, its members were "first and foremost, advocates of high, even prohibitive, protection; they possessed a profound belief in the virtuosity of the small business enterprise and the necessity to furnish it with a financial and political superstructure".

In June 1951, the AIPL was renamed as the Australian Industries Development Association (AIDA). Hosiery manufacturer George Foletta served as the organisation's president from 1951 to 1956.

Post-merger
The Business Council of Australia was formed in 1983 from a merger of AIDA and the Business Roundtable.

Structure

Board
The board oversees the council's secretariat, committees and task forces, makes recommendations about membership and appointments, and proposes policies.

Board members, as of March 2021, were:
 President: Tim Reed, joint managing director, Potentia Capital; director, Transurban
 Chief executive: Jennifer Westacott
 Karen Dobson, managing director, Dow Chemical Company
Danny Gilbert AM, managing partner, Gilbert + Tobin
Alan Joyce, chief executive officer, Qantas
Alison Kitchen, national chairman, KPMG
Susan Lloyd-Hurwitz, chief executive officer and managing director, Mirvac
 Alison Watkins; director, Centre for Independent Studies; former group managing director, Coca-Cola Amatil.

Former presidents include Catherine Livingstone, Tony Shepherd, Michael Chaney, Hugh Morgan, Roderick Carnegie and Arvi Parbo.

The secretariat works on policy, research, communications and administrative support.

The Strong Australia Network was established to lobby for regional businesses, and BizRebuild to help businesses damaged by floods or bushfires.

Policy
The council's policy agenda has included plans to reform post-secondary education, cut rates of personal and company tax, and strengthen enterprise bargaining.  

Members help develop policy through committees and special-issue task forces.

Membership
, members of the council were:

See also

Economy of Australia
Australian Competition & Consumer Commission
Council of Australian Governments
List of Australian companies
National Competition Policy

References

External links
 Official website

Business organisations based in Australia
Organizations established in 1983
1983 establishments in Australia